Transaction or transactional may refer to:

Commerce
Financial transaction, an agreement, communication, or movement carried out between a buyer and a seller to exchange an asset for payment
Debits and credits in a Double-entry bookkeeping system
Electronic funds transfer, the electronic exchange or transfer of money from one account to another
Real estate transaction, the process whereby rights in a unit of property is transferred between two or more parties
Transaction cost, a cost incurred in making an economic exchange
Transactional law, the practice of law concerning business and commerce

Computing
Transaction processing, information processing that is divided into individual, indivisible operations
Database transaction, a unit of work performed within a database management system
Atomic transaction, a series of database operations such that either all occur, or nothing occurs

Other uses
Transactions, the published proceedings of a learned society:

Transaction Publishers, a New Jersey-based publishing house that specializes in social sciences books
"Transaction" an episode of the Death Note anime series; see List of Death Note episodes
Transactional analysis, a psychoanalytic theory of psychology
Transactional interpretation, an interpretation of quantum mechanics
Transactional leadership, a leadership style described by James MacGregor Burns

See also